Karl Gustav Jöreskog (born 25 April 1935) is a Swedish statistician. Jöreskog is a Professor Emeritus at Uppsala University, and a co-author (with Dag Sörbom) of the LISREL statistical program. He is also a member of the Royal Swedish Academy of Sciences. Jöreskog received his bachelor's, master's, and doctoral degrees in Uppsala University. He is also a former student of Herman Wold. He was a statistician at Educational Testing Service (ETS) and a visiting professor at Princeton University.

Research
Jöreskog proposed a reliable numerical method for computing maximum-likelihood estimates in factor analysis; similarly reliable methods were also proposed by Gerhard Derflinger, Robert Jennrich, and Stephen M. Robinson at roughly the same time. Jöreskog's Fortran codes helped to popularize factor analysis around the world. While working at the Educational Testing Service and giving lectures at Princeton University, Jöreskog proposed a linear model for the analysis of covariance structures, a fundamental contribution to structural equation modeling (SEM).

His other research interests include multivariate analysis, item response theory,  statistical computing, and factor-analysis in geology.

Awards
In 1974 he was elected as a Fellow of the American Statistical Association.
In 2007 Jöreskog received the Award for distinguished scientific applications of psychology from the American Psychological Association (APA).
In 2004 he was awarded The Rudbeck Medal by Uppsala University.

Selected bibliography

Jöreskog, K. G. (1969). A general approach to confirmatory maximum likelihood factor analysis. Psychometrika, 34, 183–202.

 Reprinted as 

 

Jöreskog, K. G., & Sörbom, D. (1979). Advances in factor analysis and structural equation models. New York: University Press of America.
Jöreskog, K. G., & Moustaki, I. (2001). Factor analysis of ordinal variables: A comparison of three approaches. Multivariate Behavioral Research, 36, 347–387.
Jöreskog, K. G., Olsson, Ulf H., & Wallentin, Fan Y. (2016). Multivariate Analysis with LISREL. Springer International Publishing AG. .

Festschrift

Cudeck, R., Jöreskog, K. G., Du Toit, S. H. C., & Sörbom, D. (2001). Structural Equation Modeling: Present and Future : a Festschrift in Honor of Karl Jöreskog. Scientific Software International.

See also

 Causality
 Confirmatory factor analysis
 Computational statistics
 Exploratory factor analysis
 Factor analysis
 Latent variable
 LISREL
 Maximum likelihood
 Measurement theory
 Multivariate analysis
 Multivariate statistics
 Ordinal variable
 Psychometrics
 Structural equation model
 Uppsala University
 Wold, Hermann

Notes

External links
Jöreskog's presentation of the econometric research that was recognized with the  2000 Nobel Prize in economics
Profile of Karl Jöreskog on the website of SSI company
 

1935 births
Living people
Members of the Royal Swedish Academy of Sciences
Swedish statisticians
Academic staff of Uppsala University
Uppsala University alumni
People from Åmål Municipality
Fellows of the American Statistical Association
Members of the Royal Society of Sciences in Uppsala